Jalna is a 16-book series of novels by the Canadian writer Mazo de la Roche.

Jalna is the name of the fictional manor house in which the Whiteoak family lives. The name comes from Jalna, a city in west-central India, where there was a British garrison. In a prequel novel, the house is built by a retired officer of the British army who served in India. Jalna is partly based on Benares, a house in Mississauga, Canada. Benares was built in the late 1850s for a retired officer of the British army who had served in India, James B. Harris. It once occupied a larger estate, upon which de la Roche lived for a time. "Benares" is an alternate name of Varanasi, a city in India which had a British garrison.

The story 

Spanning 1854 to 1954, the Jalna series tells the story of the Whiteoak family who lived on a southern Ontario estate. The novels were not written in sequential order. Each can be read as an independent story.

There are similarities and as well as differences in the experiences of the Whiteoak family and de la Roche's. While the lives and successes of the Whiteoaks rise and fall, there remained for them the steadiness of the family manor, known as Jalna. De la Roche's family endured the illness of her mother, the perpetual job searches of her father, and the adoption of her orphaned cousin while being moved 17 times. Her family did work a farm for a few years for a wealthy man who owned the farm for a hobby. Several critics believe that Finch from Finch's Fortune (1932) is a reflection of de la Roche herself. The names of many of the characters were taken from gravestones in a Newmarket, Ontario cemetery.

Production
Jalna, first published in 1927, won the Atlantic Monthly Press's first $10,000 Atlantic Prize Novel award. De la Roche went on to write about the Whiteoak family for the next 30 years, establishing a place for herself in popular Canadian literature.  The Jalna series has been translated into many languages and was adapted for stage, radio, and television. John Cromwell directed the 1935 film adaptation, Jalna, released by RKO Radio Pictures. In 1972, the story was adapted for television and aired on the CBC as The Whiteoaks of Jalna.

By 1961, when de la Roche died, the series had sold more than eleven million copies in 193 English and 92 foreign editions.

The books

Film and television adaptations 
 Jalna, 1935, RKO Radio Pictures film
 The Whiteoak Chronicles: The Building of Jalna, 1955, BBC television Film
 The Whiteoaks of Jalna, 1972, CBC television drama miniseries

References

External links
 Jalna Series by Mazo de La Roche at Faded Page
 Benares Historic House, Mississauga, Ontario

1927 Canadian novels
Canadian historical novels
Family saga novels